In statistics, the two-way analysis of variance (ANOVA) is an extension of the one-way ANOVA that examines the influence of two different categorical independent variables on one continuous dependent variable. The two-way ANOVA not only aims at assessing the main effect of each independent variable but also if there is any interaction between them.

History
In 1925, Ronald Fisher mentions the two-way ANOVA in his celebrated book, Statistical Methods for Research Workers (chapters 7 and 8). In 1934, Frank Yates published procedures for the unbalanced case. Since then, an extensive literature has been produced. The topic was reviewed in 1993 by Yasunori Fujikoshi. In 2005, Andrew Gelman proposed a different approach of ANOVA, viewed as a multilevel model.

Data set
Let us imagine a data set for which a dependent variable may be influenced by two factors which are potential sources of variation. The first factor has  levels  and the second has  levels . Each combination  defines a treatment, for a total of  treatments.

The experimental design is balanced if each treatment has the same number of replicates, . In such a case, the design is also said to be orthogonal, allowing to fully distinguish the effects of both factors.

Model
Upon observing variation among all  data points, for instance via a histogram, "probability may be used to describe such variation". Let us hence denote by  the random variable which observed value  is the -th measure for treatment . The two-way ANOVA models all these variables as varying independently and normally around a mean, with a constant variance,  (homoscedasticity):

.

Specifically, the mean of the response variable is modeled as a linear combination of the explanatory variables:

,

Another equivalent way of describing the two-way ANOVA is by mentioning that, besides the variation explained by the factors, there remains some statistical noise. This amount of unexplained variation is handled via the introduction of one random variable per data point, called error. These  random variables are seen as deviations from the means, and are assumed to be independent and normally distributed:

.

Assumptions
Following Gelman and Hill, the assumptions of the ANOVA, and more generally the general linear model, are, in decreasing order of importance:
 the data points are relevant with respect to the scientific question under investigation;
 the mean of the response variable is influenced additively (if not interaction term) and linearly by the factors;
 the errors are independent;
 the errors have the same variance;
 the errors are normally distributed.

Parameter estimation
To ensure identifiability of parameters, we can add the following "sum-to-zero" constraints:

Hypothesis testing
In the classical approach, testing null hypotheses (that the factors have no effect) is achieved via their significance which requires calculating sums of squares.

Testing if the interaction term is significant can be difficult because of the potentially-large number of degrees of freedom.

Example
The following hypothetical example gives the yields of 15 plants subject to two different environmental variations, and three different fertilisers.

Five sums of squares are calculated:

Finally, the sums of squared deviations required for the analysis of variance can be calculated.

See also
 Analysis of variance
 F test (Includes a one-way ANOVA example)
 Mixed model
 Multivariate analysis of variance (MANOVA)
 One-way ANOVA
 Repeated measures ANOVA
 Tukey's test of additivity

Notes

References 
 

Analysis of variance